The Astra Model 900 is one of many Spanish copies of the German Mauser C96 semi-automatic pistol. It shares the same caliber, magazine capacity, and holster type and is generally very similar to the German handgun.

History
The Spanish gunmaker Astra-Unceta y Cia began producing a copy of the Mauser C.96 in 1927 that was externally similar to the C96 (including the presence of a detachable shoulder stock/holster) but with non-interlocking internal parts. It was produced until 1941, with a production hiatus in 1937 and 1938, and a final batch assembled from spare parts in 1951. 

The Spanish copies of the C96 were generally intended for export to China, but after the commencement of the Sino-Japanese war, the remaining Astra 900s were used in the Spanish Civil War, and numbers were also sold to Germany in the period 1940–1943.

Design
The  Basque-manufactured Astra-Unceta y Cia SA Astra 901 is a compact machine pistol, with a magazine capacity of 10 7.63×25mm Mauser cartridges, which is a considerably smaller capacity than is standard for a machine pistol. The next model, the Astra 902, was provided with a fixed magazine of 20 cartridges and a lengthened barrel, and Astra 903 had a removable magazine instead of the usual fixed one. Astra later added a mechanism to slow the rate of fire and make the gun more manageable (to an extent) when being fired on full-auto or burst modes, calling this the Model 904. 

The Model 904 is comparable to the German Mauser M712 'Schnellfeuer' Broomhandle pistols, having a detachable magazine, automatic fire capabilities, and general appearance.

The Astra Model 904 was produced in a 9 mm Largo variant, the Astra Model 904E, which was identical to the Model 904 in all other respects.

Production and distribution
The following models were made by Astra:

 Astra 900: 21,000 weapons from 1927 to 1941 for China, Latin America, Spanish Republicans, and the Wehrmacht (1,050 delivered in 1943).
 Astra 901: 1,655 weapons in 1928, destined mainly for China.
 Astra 902: 7,075 weapons in 1928 to 1933. Some delivered to China, others delivered to the Wehrmacht in 1943.
 Astra 903: 3,082 weapons in 1932 to 1934. Same users as the 902.
 Astra 904: 90+ weapons in 1934.
 Astra F: 1,126 weapons in 1936. Issued to the Guardia Civil during Spanish Civil War.
 Astra E: 548 weapons assembled between 1949, 1951 and 1961 from stored parts. Reserved for export to Egypt, India, Iraq and Pakistan.
 8 × Astra 900, 12 × Astra 902, and 9 × Astra 400, all richly engraved, were presented to Joseph Stalin during the Spanish Civil War in 1937.

Users

 
 : Astra Fs known to be issued to the Guardia Civil.https://www.wargm.org/armoury/index.php?mode=2&cat=Allied+and+Neutral+Self+Loading+Pistols&item=18

References

Machine pistols
Semi-automatic pistols of Spain
World War II infantry weapons
9mm Largo firearms
7.63×25mm Mauser firearms